Iqbal Siddiqui  (born 26 December 1974) is an Indian cricketer. He is a right-handed batsman and a right-arm medium-fast bowler. Having made his debut for Maharashtra in the 1992-93 Ranji Trophy, Siddiqui's frame generates a considerable amount of pace. In spite of his low first-class batting average, he has also once scored a first class century.

He played one Test in 2001, against England. England had gained a meager 5 run lead at the start of India's second innings. Captain Saurav Ganguly sent Siddiqui in to bat, even though his regular position was in the tail, and he hit the winning runs in his only ever Test match to date, a record he shares with Australian player Jeff Moss.

Despite having played only one Test, Iqbal Siddiqui is the only Indian other than Manoj Prabhakar till date to open both the bowling and batting on debut, in Test matches.

In the 2006 cricket season he played for Sevenoaks Vine in the Kent cricket league.

References

See also
One Test Wonder

1974 births
Living people
Indian Muslims
India Test cricketers
Indian cricketers
West Zone cricketers
Maharashtra cricketers
Hyderabad cricketers
Cricketers from Aurangabad, Maharashtra
People from Marathwada